The Committee for the Defence of the Republic (CDR) was a far-right political party in San Marino led by Bonelli Menetto.

History
The party was established in March 1974. In the 1974 general elections it received 3% of the vote and won a single seat in the Grand and General Council. In the 1978 elections its vote share dropped to 2.8%, but the party retained its one seat. However, it did not contest any further elections.

References

Defunct political parties in San Marino
Far-right political parties
Political parties established in 1974
1974 establishments in San Marino
Sammarinese nationalism